HMS Rupert was a 64-gun third rate ship of the line of the Royal Navy, ordered on 26 October 1664 as part of the ship construction programme of that year. She was launched on 26 January 1666 at Harwich Dockyard.

In his diary entry of 19 May 1666, Samuel Pepys of the Navy Board describes a conversation concerning the construction of the Rupert that he had with her designer, Anthony Deane:

By 1677 the Rupert carried a complement of 400 men and 66 guns (comprising twenty-six 24-pounders, twenty-four 12-pounders, fourteen sakers [5-pounders] and two 3-pounders), but by 1685 she was carrying only 64 guns again (comprising twenty-four 24-pounders, two culverins, twenty-six 12-pounders and twelve demi-culverins).

In 1697 she was taken into Plymouth Dockyard to be rebuilt by Benjamin Rosewell, and she was relaunched in November 1703 as a 66-gun third rate once again. In 1716 she was reduced to a fourth rate, and on 16 August 1736 she was ordered to be taken to pieces and rebuilt at Sheerness Dockyard, although by this date the practice of rebuilding had become a legal fiction, and 'rebuilt' ships were in practice new vessels incorporating a small portion of their predecessor's timber into the construction. She was relaunched on 27 October 1740 as 60-gun fourth rate ship of the line built to the 1733 proposals of the 1719 Establishment.

Rupert was broken up in 1769.

Notes

References

Lavery, Brian (2003) The Ship of the Line - Volume 1: The development of the battlefleet 1650-1850. Conway Maritime Press. .

Ships of the line of the Royal Navy
1660s ships
Ships built in Harwich